Darkest Dungeon II is a role-playing video game developed and published by Red Hook Studios as the sequel to Darkest Dungeon (2016). The game was released in early access for Microsoft Windows in October 2021, with the most recent update reintroducing the Vestal playable character from the first game. The experimental branch is currently on the Redemption Road update. The full version of the game is set to be released in early May 2023.

Gameplay
Like its predecessor, Darkest Dungeon II is a role-playing video game with roguelike elements. The game features multiple characters, and each of them has their own unique strengths and abilities. Players can equip these characters with trinkets and combat items. The player can commandeer the stagecoach, which is the primary way of navigating the game's world. The ultimate goal is to reach a mountain, which is the source of evil that has overtaken the world. As the player explores, they will encounter different locations of interest and roadblocks, and the player will enter combat scenarios. Combat in the game is turn-based, and the heroes must be positioned properly as some of their skills cannot be used when they are standing in a wrong spot. As the player explores the world, they can also visit Shrines of Reflection, where players can learn more about the backstories of the game's characters.

As the characters progress in the game, their stress level would increase. Under a lot of stress, they will have a debilitating meltdown during combat, which would result in a massive decrease in health and the acquisition of negative traits. In addition, high stress levels would affect the relationships between the game's characters. If a character is friendly with another, they would gain additional gameplay perks. However, if the characters share a hostile relationship, one may stop another from using their skills and increase each other's stress level. Players can visit a Hospital to remove bad character traits. When a member of the team dies, another one will join the player's team once they reach an inn. It is also the place where the players can lower the stress level of characters and improve team dynamics. However, a stay at the inn would also increase Loathing, a stat which indicates the all-consuming evil of the world. The flame on the stagecoach represents the team's hope. The player's team will suffer from penalties when the flame is nearly extinguished. When a run ends, Profile rank would increase, which would unlock new characters and items for players to use in subsequent runs.

Development
While the game will use an improved version of the core combat system, the studio stated its intent offer a completely different metagame experience, including the transition from 2D to 3D graphics using Unity. Narratively, the game is planned to show the nature of the evils emerging into the world beyond what players saw at the estate from the first game. To complete the sequel, Red Hook had already expanded its team from 5 developers for the original game to 14 and potentially more. Composer Stuart Chatwood, narrator Wayne June, and sound design team Power Up Audio will continue to support work for the sequel.

Red Hook announced Darkest Dungeon 2 in February 2019.  Red Hook anticipates using early access again for the sequel as player feedback was essential to the development of the first game. The sequel was released in early access via the Epic Games Store on October 26, 2021 for Windows. 100,000 copies were sold on the day of the game's early access release. The game was originally set to be released in full in February 2023 via both the Epic Games Store and Steam, but was delayed to May 8, 2023. Console versions are currently in development.

References

External links
 

Upcoming video games scheduled for 2023
Cthulhu Mythos video games
Dark fantasy video games
Early access video games
Indie video games
Role-playing video games
Roguelike video games
Single-player video games
Video games about mental health
Video games developed in Canada
Video games scored by Stuart Chatwood
Video game sequels
Video games using procedural generation
Windows games
Windows-only games
Gothic video games